Mersin Free Zone is a free economic zone in Mersin, Turkey.
 
It was established on 3 January, 1987. It was the first free zone of Turkey. Its initial area was   The area is now . It is operated by Mesbaş firm with build-operate-transfer method. With a handling capacity of 9 million tonnes of bulk cargo and 2,6 million tonnes of 	containerized cargo it is the second largest free zone of Turkey.

References

Buildings and structures in Mersin
Akdeniz District
Economy of Turkey
Special economic zones